The Jackson Chargers were an American soccer team based in Jackson, Mississippi that played in the PDL (formerly the USISL Premier League) from 1995 to 1999. The team had very successful consecutive seasons in 1998 and 1999, becoming regular season champions in both years and going undefeated, 16-0, in the 1998 season before losing the championship match to Southwest rivals San Gabriel Valley Highlanders. The team dissolved following the 1999 season.

History
The Chargers became a founding member of the newly reorganized fourth tier of the American soccer pyramid, joining the USISL Premier League in its inaugural 1995 season. The league, operated by United Soccer Leagues, would later become the Premier Development Soccer League (PDSL) in 1997 and the Premier Development League (PDL) (the name it is known as today) in the Chargers final active season in 1999.

The Chargers became an annual contender early in league history, claiming the regular season championship and recording a perfect season by winning every regular season match in 1998. They followed this up with a strong performance in 1999, again earning the regular season championship but stumbling in the playoffs.

Following their season in 1999, the team folded.

Year-by-year

See also
 Mississippi Brilla

References

Defunct Premier Development League teams
Defunct soccer clubs in Mississippi
1995 establishments in Mississippi
1999 disestablishments in Mississippi
Association football clubs established in 1995
Association football clubs disestablished in 1999
Sports in Jackson, Mississippi